Mušdam(m)a, inscribed dmuš-dam-ma, and titled šidim gal den-líl-lá-ke4, "the great builder of Enlil,” was an ancient Mesopotamian divine architect who was appointed as patron god of house construction by Enki in the myth “Enki and the World Order.”

Mythology
 
In his long list of divine appointments in “Enki and the World Order,” his assignment of the god Mušdama is described:
 

He is assigned as building constructor to the role of mason given to Kulla, the brick-god.

References
 

Mesopotamian gods